The Cicaré CH-1 was a helicopter designed and built by Augusto Cicaré in Argentina in the early 1960s.

Design
The CH-1 was a single-seat, single-engine helicopter driving two counter-rotating co-axial rotors, each featuring two blades. The airframe of the helicopter was made entirely from steel. The inclination of the rotors' axis was dictated by the cyclic control of the CH-1.

Specifications

References

Helicopters